The  Koshigaya Alphas is a professional basketball team that competes in the  second division of the Japanese B.League.

Coaches
Yoshinori Kaneta
Kenji Okamura
Kazuto Aono
Junpei Takahara
Sho Higashijima

Roster

Notable players

Ryuzo Anzai
James Blasczyk
Luke Evans (fr)
Takeshi Hasegawa
Drew Naymick
Raymond Nixon
Daisuke Noguchi
Kenji Okamura
Daniel Orton
Kyle Richardson
Hiroki Sato
Daisuke Takaoka
Kenji Yamada

Arenas
Koshigaya Municipal General Gymnasium
Brex Arena Utsunomiya
Saitama Prefectural University
Dokkyo University
Bunkyo University
Wing Hat Kasukabe
Koshigaya City Minami Gymnasium
Mainichi Kogyo Arena Kuki
Gyoda City General Gymnasium
Kisai General Gymnasium Fuji Arena

References

Basketball teams in Japan
Sports teams in Saitama Prefecture
1997 establishments in Japan
Basketball teams established in 1997